Hameed Adio (born 20 January 1959) is a Nigerian sprinter. He competed in the men's 100 metres at the 1980 Summer Olympics. He was also captain of the Nigerian delegation to the games.

He is a former broadcaster with the Nigeria Television Authority serving as the manger sports news while covering the 1998 FIFA World Cup and the 1999 IAAF World Championships in Seville.

References

External links

1959 births
Living people
Athletes (track and field) at the 1980 Summer Olympics
Nigerian male sprinters
Olympic athletes of Nigeria
Place of birth missing (living people)